Manuel "Manu" Morlanes Ariño (born 12 January 1999) is a Spanish professional footballer who plays as a central midfielder for RCD Mallorca, on loan from Villarreal CF.

Club career
Born in Zaragoza, Morlanes represented local Real Zaragoza as a youth before switching to Villarreal CF's academy in the summer of 2012. He made his debut with the C-team in the 2015–16 Tercera División campaign.

On 3 September 2016, Morlanes made his debut for the B-team in a 3–2 defeat against FC Barcelona B. He suffered a knee injury during a match against CD Castellón in December, returning to play in September 2017 in a 0–0 draw against UE Llagostera. 

Morlanes made his first-team debut on 8 December 2017, starting in a 1–0 defeat against Maccabi Tel Aviv in UEFA Europa League. The following 13 June, he renewed his contract until 2023.

Morlanes made his La Liga debut on 18 August 2018, starting in a 2–1 home loss against Real Sociedad. Ahead of the 2019–20 campaign, he was definitely promoted to the main squad.

On 7 September 2020, Morlanes was loaned to Segunda División side UD Almería for one year, with a buyout clause. After being a regular starter, Almería exercised the buyout clause on his contract, but Villarreal also activated the buy-back clause to retain the player.

On 16 August 2021, Morlanes signed a new contract with the Yellow Submarine until 2026, and joined fellow top tier side RCD Espanyol on loan for the 2021–22 season. Back to his parent club for the 2022–23 campaign, he featured rarely before moving to RCD Mallorca also in the top tier on 31 January 2023, also in a temporary deal.

Career statistics

Honours
Spain U17
UEFA European Under-17 Championship runner-up: 2016

References

External links

1999 births
Living people
Spanish footballers
Footballers from Zaragoza
Association football midfielders
Spain youth international footballers
Spain under-21 international footballers
La Liga players
Segunda División players
Segunda División B players
Tercera División players
Villarreal CF C players
Villarreal CF B players
Villarreal CF players
UD Almería players
RCD Espanyol footballers
RCD Mallorca players